Giacomo Cordella (Naples, 25 July 1786 – Naples, 8 May 1847) was an Italian composer.

Biography
Cordella studied in Naples with Fedele Fenaroli and Giovanni Paisiello. In 1804 he composed his first work, a cantata entitled La Vittoria dell'Arca contro Gerico. With the help of Paisiello in 1805 he had the possibility to produce in Venice his first opera, Il ciarlatano, which was appreciated for its comic verve and then performed in other cities in northern Italy, including Milan, Turin and Padua.

Cordella continued his activity mainly in Naples, where he was appreciated for his opere buffe, while his few opere serie met with failures. His greatest success was Una follia, first performed in 1813, an opera buffa featuring "a vivacious plot and a melody that flows agreeably". Cordella composed also sacred music.

Works

Operas

Other
La vittoria dell'Arca contro Gerico, cantata, Naples, 1804
Manfredi trovatore, cantata, Naples, Teatro San Carlo, 6 July 1836 (in collaboration with other composers)
Il dono a Partenope, cantata, libretto by Giovanni Schmidt, Naples, Teatro San Carlo, 30 May 1840 (in collaboration with other composers)
Cordella composed many other works, including masses, motets and works for small ensembles.

References
Notes

Sources

1786 births
1847 deaths
Italian classical composers
Italian male classical composers
Italian opera composers
Male opera composers
Musicians from Naples
19th-century Italian musicians
19th-century Italian male musicians